Torben Jørgensen may refer to:

 Torben Jørgensen (epidemiologist), Danish epidemiologist
 Torben Jørgensen (historian), Danish historian
 , Danish athlete